Strathearn School is an 11–18 girls voluntary grammar school in Belfast, County Antrim, Northern Ireland.

History 
In 1864,  of land were bought by William Mullan and Robert Mullan, on which Strathearn House was built. In 1904, Mullan sold the house to Alexander Taylor, who died in October 1928. The house was then sold to the Victoria College girls' school, based in south Belfast, and which opened Strathearn School in 1929 to serve as a junior school, serving the Belmont and Knock areas. The initial enrolment was 63 pupils.

Miss Miskelly, who taught classics at Victoria, became the first headmistress. At this time, the school was co-educational. Boys, however, left the school at age eight, with most moving to Cabin Hill boys' school, while the girls stayed until fourteen, after which they could move to Victoria.

During the Second World War, the school was evacuated to the Argory, near Dungannon, and then to Portballintrae. In 1950, a separate Strathearn Committee of Victoria College was established and Strathearn adopted its own distinct uniform of green, fawn and wine. In 1952, Penrhyn House was bought and converted into a preparatory department. By 1980, there were 469 pupils in the secondary school, and this had grown to 759 by 1997. In 1987, the house beside this was also purchased and served as another school building.

In 1988, the control of the school by the founding Victoria College was relinquished and Strathearn School Belfast was established with its own board of governors.

The school has recently undergone a complete rebuild, finished in 2016. In 2018, the senior chamber choir became the Songs Of Praise Senior Young Choir Of The Year after coming runners-up in the old format in 2015.

Headteachers 
 1929–1944 Miss Miskelly
 1944–1958 Miss Rodden, who built Rodden House
 1958–1979 Miss Hamilton, who built the science labs
 1979–1997 Miss Lamb, who built the sixth form centre, music department and sports hall
 1997- 2016 Mr Manning, who oversaw the building of an entire new school build
 2017- Mrs Connery, current headmistress

Houses 
The school is divided into four houses: 
 Barbour (yellow)
 Boucher (blue)
 McCaughey (green)
 Watts (red)

Each house was named after a school governor, introduced by Miss Rodden in 1944. Inter-house sports competitions and house plays are held annually.

Notable alumni 

 Lucy Caldwell, playwright and author
 Margaret Mountford, businesswoman
 Andrea Catherwood, Newsreader

References

External links 
 

Girls' schools in Northern Ireland
Grammar schools in Belfast

Preparatory schools in Northern Ireland
Educational institutions established in 1929
1929 establishments in Northern Ireland
Protestant schools in Northern Ireland